Trochus tentorium is a species of sea snail, a marine gastropod mollusk in the family Tegulidae.

Description
It differs from Trochus maculatus Linnaeus, 1758 in being obviously longitudinally plicate, especially on the lower part of each whorl.

Distribution
This species occurs in the following locations:
 Tanzania
 the Philippines
 Fiji Islands

References

 Patterson Edward, J. K.; Ravinesh, R. & Biju Kumar, A. (2022). Molluscs of the Gulf of Mannar, India and adjacent waters: A fully illustrated guide. Suganthi Devadason Marien Research Institute & Department of Aquatic Biology and Fisheries, University of Kerala. Tuticorin. i-xx, 1-524.

External links
 Gmelin, J. F. (1791). Vermes. In: Gmelin J.F. (Ed.) Caroli a Linnaei Systema Naturae per Regna Tria Naturae, Ed. 13. Tome 1(6). G.E. Beer, Lipsiae
 To GenBank (3 nucleotides; 1 proteins)
 To World Register of Marine Species

tentorium
Gastropods described in 1791